Shameka Delynn Christon (born February 15, 1982) is an American retired professional women's basketball player who most recently played with the Phoenix Mercury in the WNBA.

She attended college at the University of Arkansas, and was named the Player Of The Year in the Southeastern Conference during her 2004 senior year. She graduated with a bachelor's degree in social work.

She was selected by the Liberty as the fifth overall pick in the 2004 WNBA Draft.

Between WNBA seasons, she has played for two Israeli teams (Elizur Ramla and Raanana Hertzliya) and Spanish club Rivas Futura. Her teammates on the Spanish squad included then-fellow Liberty player Becky Hammon.

Christon was invited to the USA Basketball Women's National Team training camp in the fall of 2009. 
Christon was one of twenty players named to the national team pool. Twelve of this group will be chosen to represent the US in the 2010 World Championships and the 2012 Olympics.

In March 2010, Christon was traded to the Chicago Sky in a three-team, multi-player deal.

On February 8, 2012, Christon signed with the San Antonio Silver Stars.

On March 24, 2015, Christon signed with the Phoenix Mercury,

Arkansas statistics
Source

USA Basketball

Christon was named to the USA Women's U19 team which represented the US in the 2001 U19 World's Championship, held in Brno, Czech Republic in July 2001. Christon scored 5.7 points per game, and helped the USA team to a 6–1 record and the bronze medal.

Awards and achievements
 2009 WNBA All-Star Selection

External links
WNBA player profile
2004 WNBA Draft prospect profile
Safsal player profile

References

1982 births
Living people
All-American college women's basketball players
American women's basketball players
Arkansas Razorbacks women's basketball players
Basketball players from Arkansas
Chicago Sky players
Hot Springs High School (Arkansas) alumni
New York Liberty draft picks
New York Liberty players
Phoenix Mercury players
San Antonio Stars players
Shooting guards
Sportspeople from Hot Springs, Arkansas
Women's National Basketball Association All-Stars